Michael Carr is an Irish former Gaelic footballer who played for Cill Chartha and the Donegal county team.

Carr was man of the match in the 1980 Donegal Senior Football Championship final.

He was again man of the match in the 1983 Ulster Senior Football Championship final victory over Cavan, denying his clubmate Martin McHugh, who had scored 0–7 of Donegal's 1–14.

References

Year of birth missing (living people)
Living people
Donegal inter-county Gaelic footballers
Kilcar Gaelic footballers